Eje Thelin (born Eilert Ove Thelin) (June 9, 1938 – May 18, 1990) was a Swedish trombonist.

Thelin led his own quintet in 1961. From 1968 to 1972, he was on the faculty of the Music Academy in Graz, Austria. For the rest of the 1970s, he led his own Eje Thelin Group in Sweden.

Discography

As leader
 So Far-Eje Thelin Quintet (Columbia [EMI], 1963)
 Eje Thelin Quintet at the German Jazz Festival (Dragon, 1964)
 Eje Thelin Trio 1965 (Dragon, 2016) – with Bengt Hallberg
 Eje Thelin with Barney Wilen (Dragon, 1966)
 Rolf & Joachim Kühn: Monday Morning  Rolf Kühn, Joachim Kühn (HörZu, 1969)
 Joachim Kühn/Eje Thelin Group- In Paris (Metronome, 1970)
 Eje Thelin/Pierre Favre/Jouck Minor-Candles Of Vision (Calig, 1972)
 Eje Thelin Group (Caprice, 1974)
 Eje Thelin Group-Live (Caprice, 1976)
 Eje Thelin Group-Hypothesis (MRC/Electrola, 1978)
 Eje Thelin-Bits and Pieces (Phono Suecia, 1980)
 Eje Thelin-Polyglot (Caprice, 1981) 
 Eje Thelin-E.T. Project (Dragon, 1986)

As composer
 Raggruppamento (Phono Suecia, 1980)

As sideman
With Don Cherry
 Eternal Rhythm (MPS/BASF, 1972)

With Clarinet Summit
 You Better Fly Away (1980)
 
With Graham Collier
 Hoarded Dreams (Cuneiform, 1983 [2007])

With Benny Golson
 Stockholm Sojourn (Prestige, 1974)

With Krzysztof Komeda
 Ballet Etudes (Polonia, 1962)  

With Kenny Wheeler
 Around 6 (ECM, 1979)

With Jimmy Witherspoon
 Some of My Best Friends Are the Blues (Prestige, 1964)

References

1938 births
1990 deaths
20th-century trombonists
Jazz trombonists
Swedish jazz musicians
Swedish trombonists